(born 3 March 1982 in Fukuoka, Japan) is a Japanese rugby union player. Ueda has played six international matches for the Japan national rugby union team.

Ueda was a member of the Japan team at the 2011 Rugby World Cup, playing one match against eventual winners the All Blacks.

 Ueda plays for Top League team Honda Heat.

References

Living people
1982 births
Mie Honda Heat players
Japanese rugby union players
Japan international rugby union players